{{DISPLAYTITLE:C22H28O5}}
The molecular formula C22H28O5 may refer to:

 Estradiol hemisuccinate (Estradiol succinate)
 Isoprednidene
 Meprednisone
 16α-Methyl-11-oxoprednisolone
 Prednylidene
 Pyrethrin II